The Red Bull Air Race World Championship (formerly known as the Red Bull Air Race), established in 2003 and created by Red Bull GmbH, was an international series of air races in which entrants compete to navigate a challenging obstacle course in the fastest time. Pilots flew individually against the clock and were required to complete tight turns through a slalom course consisting of inflatable pylons, known as "Air Gates".  The races were held mainly over water near cities, but were also held at airfields or natural wonders (such as Sugarloaf Mountain and Monument Valley).  Races were usually flown on weekends with the first day for qualification then knockout finals the day after. The events attracted large crowds and are broadcast, both live and in highlights, in many nations.  At each venue, the top ten places earned World Championship points. The air racer with the most points at the end of the Championship became Red Bull Air Race World Champion.  After a three-year hiatus from 2011 for safety improvements and reorganisation, the Air Race resumed in 2014.

The inaugural series comprising two races was won by the Hungarian pilot Péter Besenyei who went on to secure second place the following three series. The most successful pilot in the history of the championship is Briton Paul Bonhomme who won the title on three occasions, in 2009, 2010 and 2015.  British and American pilots are the most successful, with four titles for each nationality.  The championship was cancelled after the 2019 event.

History

The inaugural series in 2003, which consisted of two races, one in Austria and one in Hungary,  was won by the Hungarian pilot Péter Besenyei, with the German Klaus Schrodt coming second, followed by the American Kirby Chambliss.  The format was expanded the following year to encompass three venues, the United States, the United Kingdom and Austria, and was won by Chambliss.  The 2005 series expanded the competition to seven races, of which American pilot Mike Mangold won five to secure the title.  The 2006 series included eight.  Chambliss won four races against ten other pilots to win his second title in three years.  The following series included ten venues with thirteen competitors, and ended with Mangold winning his second title, ahead of British pilot Paul Bonhomme and Besenyei.

In the 2008 series, Austrian qualifier Hannes Arch took the title on his first attempt in a championship featuring eight rounds.  Bonhomme finished second and Chambliss took third place.  The 2009 series featured fifteen pilots but at fewer venues, six in total.  The previous year's runner-up Bonhomme took the title, winning three races and placing second in the other three.  Arch was second and Australian newcomer Matt Hall came third.  Bonhomme defended his title in the 2010 series, placing in the top three in each race of a six-race season.  Arch came second again, and British pilot Nigel Lamb finished third.

No Red Bull Air Race series took place between 2011 and 2013 inclusively, during which time new safety measures and standardised engines were introduced.  The 2014 series was the first to divide the field into classes, namely the "Master Class", and the "Challenger Class" in which young pilots compete.  The title was taken by Lamb, followed by Arch and Bonhomme.  The following series took place across eight venues and was won by Bonhomme, followed by Hall and Arch.  In 2016, the Red Bull Air Race season was held at seven locations, with the German pilot Matthias Dolderer winning his first title.  Hall finished second and Arch placed posthumously third, having died in an unrelated helicopter accident before the end of the championship.  The 2017 Red Bull Air Race World Championship was won by the Japanese pilot Yoshihide Muroya, with Czech pilot Martin Šonka second and Canadian Pete McLeod third.  Šonka went one better the following year, winning the title ahead of Matt Hall and Michael Goulian.

Winners and runners-up

References

External links

Red Bull Air Race World Championship
Red Bull Air Race